West Virginia Route 305 (WV 305) is a north–south state highway located entirely in Raleigh County, West Virginia. The southern terminus of the route is at West Virginia Route 54 / West Virginia Route 97 in Lester. The northern terminus is at West Virginia Route 3 near Surveyor.

WV 305 was formerly County Route 17, which continued east from Lester to Crab Orchard on modern and old WV 54.

Major intersections

References

305
Transportation in Raleigh County, West Virginia